The final of the 2020–21 Road Safety World Series took place on 21 March 2022 at the Shaheed Veer Narayan Singh International Cricket Stadium in Raipur, India. It was played between India Legends and Sri Lanka Legends. India Legends won by 14 runs for their maiden triumph.

Background
The 2020-21 Road Safety World Series initially started on 7 March 2020 and was hosted in India, with the tournament set to take place across venues in Mumbai and Pune. There were five teams initially which were India Legends, West Indies Legends, Sri Lanka Legends, Australia Legends, and South Africa Legends. 

Sachin Tendulkar (India Legends), Brian Lara (West Indies Legends) Tillakaratne Dilshan (Sri Lanka Legends), Brett Lee (Australia Legends), and Jonty Rhodes (South Africa Legends) were the captains of their respective teams. The tournament was to be played in a round-robin format with the top two finishers playing the final.

On 13 March 2020, as a result of an advisory by the Indian Government following the global coronavirus pandemic, the remaining seven matches were rescheduled to a later date. Soon, it was decided that the remaining seven matches of the tournament would be played behind closed doors in DY Patil Stadium; but then the tournament was indefinitely postponed.

Instead of starting afresh in 2021, the organizers opted to resume the previous edition, paused after only four games. Six teams took part in the tournament. They were * India Legends, Sri Lanka Legends, South Africa Legends, West Indies Legends, Bangladesh Legends, and England Legends*.

Bangladesh Legends and England Legends were added to the tournament after Australia Legends opted out due to COVID-19. Mohammad Rafique (Bangladesh Legends) and Kevin Pietersen (England Legends) were captains of their respective teams.

The venue was changed in 2021, with the remaining tournament held at Shaheed Veer Narayan Singh International Cricket Stadium, in Raipur, instead of venues in Mumbai and Pune.

Road to the final

India Legends
At the start of the tournament in March 2020, India Legends squad consisted of Sachin Tendulkar as their captain, Virender Sehwag, Yuvraj Singh, Mohammad Kaif, Irfan Pathan, Pragyan Ojha, Munaf Patel, Manpreet Gony, Zaheer Khan, Ajit Agarkar, Sameer Dighe, Abey Kuruvilla, Sanjay Bangar, Noel David, and Sairaj Bahutule, before the tournament was halted.

At the resumption of the tournament in March 2021, Subramaniam Badrinath, Naman Ojha, Yusuf Pathan, Vinay Kumar, and Rajesh Pawar were added to squad to replace Zaheer Khan, Ajit Agarkar, Sameer Dighe, Abey Kuruvilla, Sanjay Bangar, and Sairaj Bahutule.

India Legends finished top of Points Table, winning four out of five games against West Indies Legends, Sri Lanka Legends, Bangladesh Legends, and South Africa Legends. They lost their only match against England Legends and their match against Australia Legends was not played due to the unavailability of Australia Legends in the tournament. They faced West Indies Legends in the semi-final at the Shaheed Veer Narayan Singh International Cricket Stadium in Raipur winning by 12 runs.

Sri Lanka Legends
At the start of the tournament in March 2020, the Sri Lanka Legends squad consisted of Tillakaratne Dilshan as their captain, Chamara Kapugedera, Chaminda Vaas, Farveez Maharoof, Marvan Atapattu, Muttiah Muralitharan, Rangana Herath, Romesh Kaluwitharana, Sachithra Senanayake, Thilan Thushara, Malinda Warnapura, and Upul Chandana, before the tournament was halted.

At the resumption of the tournament in March 2021, Sanath Jayasuriya, Nuwan Kulasekara, Dhammika Prasad, Upul Tharanga, Russel Arnold, Kaushalya Weeraratne, Ajantha Mendis, Rangana Herath and Chinthaka Jayasinghe were added to Sri Lanka Legends squad for the year 2021, replacing Marvan Atapattu, Malinda Warnapura, Chaminda Vaas, Muttiah Muralitharan, Sachithra Senanayake, Upul Chandana and Romesh Kaluwitharana.

Sri Lanka Legends finished second in Points Table, winning five games, against Australia Legends, West Indies Legends, South Africa Legends, Bangladesh Legends, and England Legends. They lost their only match against India Legends right before the tournament was called off due to COVID-19 pandemic. They faced South Africa Legends in the second semi-final at the Shaheed Veer Narayan Singh International Cricket Stadium in Raipur winning by 8 wickets.

League stage
During the league stage in March 2020, they played against each other, where India Legends defeated Sri Lanka Legends by 5 wickets.

Match

Match officials
The match was umpired by India's Sudhir Asnani and Amiesh Saheba. Indian great Gundappa Vishwanath was the match referee, along with India's Umesh Dubey being the TV umpire and Sanjay Hazare as the fourth umpire.

Details
Sri Lanka Legends won the toss and chose to field first, with Rangana Herath opening the bowling. Indian openers Virender Sehwag and Sachin Tendulkar started cautiously, with Sehwag getting dismissed to Herath, for 10 runs, after he had hit him for a six, the previous delivery. Subramanian Badrinath showed a promising start but was dismissed by Jayasuriya for 7 runs. Yuvraj Singh was joined by Tendulkar and had a partnership of 43 runs before Tendulkar was dismissed for 30 runs, by Farveez Maharoof. After Tendulkar's dismissal, Yuvraj Singh, who was playing cautiously switched his gears and attacked Sri Lankan bowlers all over the park, with his hitting. He was well supported by Yusuf Pathan, who went berserk after the bowlers, with his clean hitting. They both shared a partnership of 85 runs, with both batsmen scoring half-centuries. In the 18th over, Yuvraj Singh was dismissed for well-made 60 runs, with Irfan Pathan joining his elder brother, who played a 3-ball cameo for his 8 runs which included a six off the last ball of the innings, while Yusuf Pathan remained unbeaten on 62*. India Legends reached 181/4 at the end of their innings.

Sri Lanka Legends in reply made a good start with Jayasuriya and Dilshan scoring 62 runs during the powerplay, with both openers going after the Indian bowlers. Dilshan was the first one to be dismissed by Yusuf Pathan, who was in good form throughout the tournament. Jayasuriya, batting with an injury struggled to run between the wickets but was hitting boundaries timely. Eventually, after Jaysauriya's dismissal, a mini-collapse occurred with Sri Lankan Legends being reduced to 91/4 at the 13th over, with Silva and Tharanga also getting dismissed cheaply. After Chinthakha Jayasinghe and Kaushalya Weeraratne started hammering the Indian bowlers and had a good partnership of 64 runs, the match was slightly in favor of Sri Lankans, with 30 runs required in the last 2 overs. After Weeraratne's dismissal, all hopes were lost and eventually Sri Lanka Legends managed to reach 167/7 at the end of their innings, with India Legends winning by 14 runs to win the inaugural Road Safety World Series.

Scorecard
1st innings

Fall of wickets: 1–19 (Sehwag, 2.5 ov), 2–35 (Badrinath, 4.2 ov), 3–78 (Tendulkar, 10.3 ov), 4–163 (Yuvraj Singh, 18.2 ov)

2nd innings

Fall of wickets: 1-62 (Tillakaratne Dilshan, 7.2 ov), 2-65 (Chamara Silva, 8.1 ov), 3-83 (Sanath Jayasuriya, 11.1 ov), 4-91 (Upul Tharanga, 12.5 ov), 5-155 (Kaushalya Weeraratne, 18.4 ov), 6-167 (Chinthaka Jayasinghe, 19.5 ov), 7-167 (Farveez Maharoof, 19.6 ov)

Post-match ceremony and celebrations
In the post-match presentation, the Sri Lanka Legends captain Tillakaratne Dilshan congratulated the Indians on their win by praising their all-round performance. He admitted that  Yusuf Pathan's batting took the match away from them even though they bowled well in the initial overs. He praised his teammates, who played well throughout the tournament, and praised Jayasuriya's batting. He also enjoyed being part of the tournament and the support from the crowd his team received.

The India Legends captain Sachin Tendulkar thanked the support from the crowd and applauded them. He also wanted to spread the message of Road Safety awareness by winning the trophy on behalf of six teams that took part in the tournament.

During the ceremony, Yusuf Pathan was adjudged Man of the Match in the finals for his 62* and 2/26. Tillakaratne Dilshan for his all-round performance throughout the tournament was chosen Player of the Tournament having scored 271 runs and taking 12 wickets.

References

Road safety
World Series Cricket